Edward Jones (died 1609) was an English politician who sat in the House of Commons at various times between 1593 and 1609.

Jones was admitted to Gray's Inn on 12 January 1588. In 1593, he was elected Member of Parliament for Grampound. He was elected MP for Penryn in 1597. In 1601 he was elected MP for Portsmouth. He became MP for Cirencester in 1604 after the elected member chose another seat and sat until his death in 1609.

References

 
 

Year of birth missing
1609 deaths
People from Penryn, Cornwall
Members of the Parliament of England for Cirencester
Members of Gray's Inn
Members of the Parliament of England for Penryn
English MPs 1593
English MPs 1597–1598
English MPs 1601
English MPs 1604–1611
Members of the Parliament of England for Grampound
Members of the Parliament of England (pre-1707) for Portsmouth